Epiphractis amphitricha is a moth of the family Oecophoridae. It is known from the Indian Ocean islands of Mauritius and Réunion.

The wingspan is about 22 mm. The forewings are dull light brownish-crimson, with some scattered fuscous scales. There is an inwardly oblique purplish-fuscous streak from the dorsum beyond the middle, reaching three-fourths across the wing and a cloudy purplish-fuscous dot in the disc beyond two-thirds, and a short inwardly oblique streak from the tornus. The hindwings are ochreous-whitish, slightly crimson-tinged towards the termen and there is a long subcostal pencil of ochreous-whitish hairs lying along the upper margin of the cell beneath the forewings.

Subspecies
Epiphractis amphitricha amphitricha
Epiphractis amphitricha reunionensis  (Viette, 1988)

References
Meyrick, E. 1910a. Descriptions of Micro-Lepidoptera from Mauritius and Chagos Isles. - Transactions of the Entomological Society of London 1910(3):366–377.

Epiphractis
Moths described in 1910